Black Wolf is an unincorporated community in Ellsworth County, Kansas, United States.

History
A post office was opened in Black Wolf in 1879, closed temporarily in 1908, reopened a few months later and remained in operation until it was closed in 1953. According to tradition, "Black Wolf" was the name of a local Indian. Black Wolf was a station on the Union Pacific Railroad.

Education
The community is served by Ellsworth USD 327 public school district.

References

Further reading

External links
 Black Wolf, an Ellsworth County Ghost Town
 Black Wolf - Another Farm Town Ghost Town
 Ellsworth County maps: Current, Historic, KDOT

Unincorporated communities in Ellsworth County, Kansas
Unincorporated communities in Kansas